Haw Creek Township is a township in Morgan County, in the U.S. state of Missouri.

Haw Creek Township takes its name from the creek of the same name within its borders.

References

Townships in Missouri
Townships in Morgan County, Missouri